LIML may refer to:
 Linate Airport, an airport with ICAO code "LIML"
 Limited information maximum likelihood, a method for estimating the linear simultaneous equations model in econometrics